Aerobiz Supersonic, known as  in Japan, is a business simulation video game released for the Super Nintendo Entertainment System by Koei in North America in August 1994. It was later ported to the Genesis. It is a sequel to Koei's previous airline simulation game, Aerobiz.

Gameplay

In the game, which is somewhat similar to its predecessor, the player is the CEO of a start-up international airline. The player competes with three other such companies (either AI-controlled or other players) for dominance in the worldwide travel industry. Such dominance is obtained by purchasing slots in various airports around the world, and flying routes to and from those slots. Once a route is created, the player has control of what type of planes fly the route, the price of airfare, and numerous other variables. The winning conditions for the player's airline are evaluated at the end of each year. These are to have a regional hub in every region, have the highest passenger total of all airlines during the given year in four to seven regions (depending on difficulty level), one of which must be the player's home region, and have a profit during the given year.

The game includes numerous historical events that can help or hinder airline performance. Four different eras of play are available for the player to choose. They include 1955–1975 (which depicts the dawn of jet airplanes), 1970–1990 (which depicts a period of instability, oil crises, and the end of the Cold War), 1985–2005 (which depicts the present day of economic prosperity and relative stable peace), and 2000–2020 (which depicts the replacement of jet planes with supersonic airplanes, the European Union extending to Russia, and countries trying to get airlines to fund alternative fuel research). This futuristic era was chosen by SG and Koei to be illustrated by San Francisco illustrator Marc Ericksen for the packaging art, showing two executives conferring over a holographic aircraft design in a futuristic airline terminal.

Airlines must be able to achieve the goals assigned to them within 20 years; only one airline can achieve this victory with no draws permitted. If none of the airlines can achieve the goal, then all airlines lose because stalemates are not permitted at the end of the game. Tiebreakers are also not permitted because games are not usually designed to be in ties at the end of the 20-year contest. In the rare instance that all airlines go bankrupt simultaneously, then all airlines would also lose.

Events

Historical events
The simulation includes numerous historical events, including:

Summer Olympic Games accurate up to Sydney 2000. (Note, the 1976 Summer Olympics were in Montreal, although the game has them in Toronto as Montreal is not in the game. However, some events of these games were held in Toronto, and in other cities throughout Eastern Canada.)
The downfall of colonialism
The secession of Singapore from Malaysia
The Rise of Fidel Castro (1959)
Suez Crisis
Indo-Pakistani War of 1971
Yom Kippur War
An international oil crisis (1973)
Iran–Iraq War
Operation Desert Storm
Perestroika
Destruction of the Berlin Wall and the reunification of Germany
Fall of the Soviet Union
Return of Hong Kong to the People's Republic of China
Growth of the European Union

Hypothetical events
The simulation also includes hypothetical events, including:

 After 2000, the Summer Olympics start occurring in random selection of the game's major cities.
Ukraine joining the European Union at JUL 1998.
Belarus joining the European Union at JAN 1999.
Switzerland joining the European Union at JUL 2003.
Russia joining the European Union at OCT 2005.
Civil war by random cities and random times (Although in the game, they often occur in Lima, Peru, which had a civil war in real time)
The introduction and quick obsolescence of commercial supersonic aircraft (2007–2016)
Global oil crisis in the mid-late 2010s
The nations of the world asking the airlines for money to find alternatives to fossil fuels
Volcanic eruption in New Zealand
Floods in Thailand and Vancouver, Canada (both events corresponding with global climate change)
Earthquake in Sao Paulo

Major players in the game

Eastern Bloc
From the beginning of the game until 1986, the Eastern Bloc countries are stuck with tense relations with Western Europe, North America, and countries in the British Commonwealth. In particular, their worst-possible relationship with the United States, United Kingdom, and Japan means airlines located in the Eastern Bloc cannot buy from the big American planemakers of the time, Boeing, Lockheed, and McDonnell-Douglas. However, they have normal-excellent relations with African countries, Middle Eastern countries, countries in Central America, South America, and some Asian countries. Furthermore, relations with France are decent enough that Eastern Bloc companies can buy from countries based there like Airbus and Sud Aviation, though at a markup. Airplanes from Eastern Bloc countries are, in general, represented as undersized and inefficient gas-guzzlers that can only do medium-range flights as their longest routes; however, their base cost is cheaper and they can perform certain specialty roles well.

After perestroika in 1986, airlines from these countries can purchase airplanes from the United States thanks to normalization of relations. These airplanes become even cheaper following the collapse of the Eastern Bloc in 1989-1991. In the game's hypothetical then-future scenario (2000-2020) Russia enters the EU in 2005, making Airbus prices cheaper. Ilyushin and Tupolev airplanes remain very cheap and become more efficient than earlier models.

Western Bloc

Western Europe
With normal-tense relations with Eastern European countries until around 1985, airlines that are headquartered in Western European countries must either purchase cheap airplanes from the "local" market or order slightly more expensive planes from the United States of America. After Perestroika, they can purchase from any plane manufacturing company. Joining the European Union in the mid-1990s makes airplanes cheaper or more expensive depending on relations with the United States prior to the founding of the EU.

North America
North America's situation in the game is identical to the situation found by Western European countries. The only difference is that planes from American companies are cheaper than planes from Western European countries. Since North America has a higher tourism rating than Europe until the 1990s, North America–based airlines can afford more airplanes and routes for a better risk-profit potential than European-based airlines.

People's Republic of China and other countries
Normalized relations with both the U.S. and the U.S.S.R. allows all planes to be purchased by airlines headquartered in the People's Republic of China regardless of the year. However, improving relations with either country will reduce the price of the airplanes - giving the player a choice of acquiring either inefficient Soviet-made planes or efficient American-made planes at bargain prices. Like the People's Republic of China, countries that are not strongly affiliated with either NATO or Warsaw Pact may purchase from any manufacturer as long as relations are not tense (red). Relations with the country must be at least normal (orange) in order to purchase airplanes from that country.

Reception
Electronic Gaming Monthly gave the Super NES version a 7.2 out of 10, deeming it "a different type of game - one geared more toward strategy." They gave the later Genesis version a 6.6 out of 10 and opined that "As always, Koei manages to make a unique strategy game that becomes very entertaining when you really get into it."

Next Generation reviewed the Genesis version of the game, rating it three stars out of five, and stated that "sim fans are sure to be pleased with the level of detail."

VideoGames selected it as a runner-up for 1994's Best Strategy Game award, which was won by Equinox.

References

External links

1993 video games
Business simulation games
Koei games
Super Nintendo Entertainment System games
Sega Genesis games
Digital tabletop games
Video games developed in Japan
Video games scored by Taku Iwasaki
Video games set in Africa
Video games set in Asia
Video games set in Cuba
Video games set in Egypt
Video games set in Europe
Video games set in the Middle East
Video games set in North America
Video games set in South America
Multiplayer and single-player video games
Video games set in the Soviet Union